Facundo Jeremías Guichón Sisto (born 8 February 1991), is an Uruguayan footballer who plays as a left winger for Guayaquil City F.C. in the Liga PRO Ecuador.

Club career
Born in Florida, Guichón graduated with Peñarol's youth setup, and was promoted to the main squad in 2010, aged 19. He made his first-team debut on 15 May 2011, replacing injured Jonathan Urretavizcaya in a 1–4 home loss against River Plate for the Uruguayan Primera División championship.

Guichón subsequently served loan stints at Racing Montevideo and El Tanque Sisley, appearing sparingly in both clubs. On 1 September 2014 he signed for Spanish Segunda División side AD Alcorcón.

On 7 July 2015 Guichón rescinded his contract with the Madrid outfit, and moved to fellow league team Deportivo Alavés six days later, after agreeing to a two-year deal. Mainly used as a substitute, he contributed with 30 appearances and one goals as his side returned to La Liga after a ten-year absence.

On 22 July 2016, Guichón signed a one-year contract with UCAM Murcia CF, still in the second division. On 21 December, after appearing rarely, he rescinded his contract.

Guichón left Seinäjoen Jalkapallokerho by mutual consent in July 2017.

Guichón is currently playing for Colombian club Independiente Santa Fe since the start of the 2018-II season with 2 goals so far.

Honours
Peñarol
Uruguayan Primera División: 2012–13

Alavés
Segunda División: 2015–16

References

External links

1991 births
Living people
People from Florida Department
Uruguayan footballers
Uruguayan expatriate footballers
Association football wingers
Peñarol players
Racing Club de Montevideo players
Rampla Juniors players
El Tanque Sisley players
AD Alcorcón footballers
Deportivo Alavés players
UCAM Murcia CF players
UE Costa Brava players
Deportes Iquique footballers
Independiente Santa Fe footballers
Seinäjoen Jalkapallokerho players
Alki Oroklini players
Guayaquil City F.C. footballers
Chilean Primera División players
Uruguayan Primera División players
Segunda División B players
Segunda División players
Veikkausliiga players
Categoría Primera A players
Cypriot Second Division players
Uruguayan expatriate sportspeople in Chile
Uruguayan expatriate sportspeople in Colombia
Uruguayan expatriate sportspeople in Spain
Uruguayan expatriate sportspeople in Finland
Uruguayan expatriate sportspeople in Cyprus
Expatriate footballers in Chile
Expatriate footballers in Colombia
Expatriate footballers in Spain
Expatriate footballers in Finland
Expatriate footballers in Cyprus